Katerina Lily Poulios (born 3 January 2001, Westminster, London) is a British-born figure skater who competes for Greece. As of July 2013, she was two-time champion of the Greek National Figure Skating Championships and placed second at Novice and Junior level in 2016 and 2017, respectively. She then gained a place on the National Hellenic Team, enabling her to compete in ISU Events. She represented Greece at the 2014 ISU World Development Trophy in Gdańsk, Poland. She has also appeared on British daytime television programme, This Morning, broadcast on ITV, alongside British figure skater Anna Litvinenko. She is coached by Melissa Galvin and 2015 British Pairs Champion, Hamish Gaman.

Personal life 

Poulios was born on 3 January 2001 in St Mary's Hospital, London, England. She attends Christ's Hospital School, in Horsham, West Sussex. She takes part in a wide range of extra-curricular activities, including music and theatre.

Career 
Poulios began skating at the age of ten, at Guildford. She won the Greek National Figure Skating Championships in 2013 and 2014, and came second in 2016 and 2017. She has been representing Greece internationally since the 2014–15 season, making her International début at the 2014 Skate Southern International, in Lee Valley, London, placing fourth. She was then selected to represent Greece at the 2014 ISU World Development Trophy in Gdańsk, Poland, where she placed eighth.

References 

2001 births
British female single skaters
Greek female single skaters
Living people